Keith Falconer Fletcher was born in Altamont, New York, on September 24, 1900, and died in Modesto, California, in 1987.  He was a book dealer.  He served in the Massachusetts House of Representatives, 6th Hampden District, from 1937 to 1942.  He was educated at Sidney High School in New York, Hamilton College, and completed his graduate studies at Harvard University.  He was a member of the Delta Kappa Epsilon fraternity.  Prior to serving in the House of Representatives, Fletcher served on the Springfield City Council (1936).

See also
 Massachusetts legislature: 1937–1938, 1939, 1941–1942

Sources 
Public Officials of Massachusetts 1941-42 Howard's "Who's Who" of the Legislature

1900 births
1987 deaths
Hamilton College (New York) alumni
Harvard University alumni
Members of the Massachusetts House of Representatives
People from Albany County, New York
Massachusetts city council members
20th-century American politicians